Anatoly Fedorovich Kasheida (Kosheida) (August 14, 1928 in Talne, USSR – June 19, 1998 in Uman, Ukraine) was a Soviet writer, poet, journalist of Ukrainian descent.

In 1947 he graduated from the Baku naval preparatory school, then studied at the Higher Naval College named Mikhail Frunze. In 1958, was dismissed in stock. Then he studied at the Gorky Literary Institute in Moscow and worked in the press agency Novosti.

Bibliography 

 "I Love"
 "Matrosskaya Sea"
 "Is miles lag"
 "A swan white and black swan - friends"
 "Africa was called"
 "Continent"
 "Hard Bank"

1928 births
1998 deaths
Soviet male poets
20th-century male writers
Soviet journalists
Male journalists
20th-century journalists